Kundrotas is the masculine form of a Lithuanian family name. Its feminine forms  are: Kundrotienė (married woman or widow) and Kundrotaitė (unmarried woman).

The surname may refer to:

Arūnas Kundrotas, Lithuanian politician
Česlovas Kundrotas (b. 1961), Lithuanian long-distance runner

Lithuanian-language surnames